Gangsters Incorporated, also known as Bad Fellaz is a 2015 American action comedy film directed and written by William Lee. It stars Mel Novak and Joe Estevez.

Plot
Vinny Vincenzo (William Lee), an extremely intelligent, ruthless and tough gangster who joins the mob and works and fights his way up the ranks to be bestowed the title of the first African-American Don. His Daily Struggles to maintain his power while fighting off FBI official Stick (Mel Novak) are chronicled.

Cast
 Mel Novak as Stick
 Joe Estevez as The Vice President
 Shawn C. Phillips as Jacky Jackster
 William Lee as Vinny Vincenzo
 Corum Sanford as EJ McFlame
 Steve Guynn as Eddie
 William Wreggelsworth as Tommy Patrone
 Angela D. Williams as Alexis Sekone

References

External links
 

2015 films
American action comedy films
2015 action comedy films
2015 comedy films
2010s English-language films
2010s American films